The French Ambassador's Arrival in Venice or Reception of the French Ambassador in Venice is a 1726-1727 oil on canvas painting by Canaletto, depicting Count Jacques-Vincent Languet de Gergy disembarking onto the quay in front the Doge's Palace and being greeted by officials of the Venetian Republic. It was acquired by Catherine the Great between 1763 and 1796 and now hangs in the Hermitage Museum in St Petersburg.

References

Paintings of Venice by Canaletto
Paintings in the collection of the Hermitage Museum
1727 paintings

Paintings of Venice